Nationality words link to articles with information on the nation's poetry or literature (for instance, Irish or France).

Events

Works published

British Australia
 Henry Lawson, "A Song for the Republic", English, the author's first published poem, in The Bulletin, October 1 issue; Australia

British India
 Narsinhrao Divetia, Kusumamala, Gujarati, his first collection of poems, "considered a definite advance in modern Gujarati poetry because of its novel use of poetic diction", according to A handbook of Indian Literature"
 Kandukuri Veeresalingam, Narada Samvadam, Telugu long poem condemning banal, rule-minded poetry

Canada
 George Frederick Cameron, Lyrics on Freedom, Love and Death, English, posthumously published (by his brother).
 Louis-Honoré Fréchette, La légende d'un peuple, French, the author's best-known work, about episodes of Canadian history; French Canadian author published in Paris
 Sarah Anne Curzon, Laura Secord, the Heroine of 1812: A Drama, and Other Poems, English.
 Susie Frances ed. The Canadian Birthday Book, English, poetry anthology. (Toronto: Robinson).
William Douw Lighthall, Thoughts, Moods and Ideals: Crimes of Leisure, English. ("Witness" Printing House).
 Thomas O'Hagan, A Gate of birginas, English.

France
 François Coppée, Arriere-saison; French
 Stéphane Mallarmé; all in French:Poésies ("Poetical Works"), in a deluxe, limited edition published in October
 Album de vers et de prose ("Selected Verse and Prose"), published in December

Ireland
 William Butler Yeats, editor, Poems and Ballads of Young Ireland, English, an anthology, Dublin, Ireland

United Kingdom

 William Allingham, Rhymes for Young Folk, English.
 Robert Browning, Parleyings with Certain People of Importance in their Day, English.
 Richard Le Gallienne, My Lady's Sonnets George Meredith, Ballads and Poems of Tragic Life, English.
 Constance Naden, A modern apostle; The elixir of life; The story of Clarice, and other poems, English.
 Robert Louis Stevenson, Underwoods, English.
 Algernon Charles Swinburne, The Jubilee, English.
 Katharine Tynan, Shamrocks, English, published in the United Kingdom by an Irish poet.

United States
 Charles Follen Adams, Dialect Ballads, English
 Amos Bronson Alcott, New Connecticut, English
 Arlo Bates, Sonnets in Shadow, English
 Palmer Cox, The Brownies: Their Book, English, children's fictional poetry
 Emma Lazarus, By The Waters of Babylon, English
 Jessie Wilson Manning, The passion of life, English
 Lizette Woodworth Reese, A Branch of May, English
 James Whitcomb Riley, Afterwhiles'', English

Awards and honors

Births
Death years link to the corresponding "[year] in poetry" article:
 January 10 – Robinson Jeffers (died 1962), American poet and playwright
 February 3 – Georg Trakl (suicide 1914), German
 February 11 – Shinobu Orikuchi 折口 信夫, also known as Chōkū Shaku 釋 迢空 (died 1953), Japanese ethnologist, linguist, folklorist, novelist and poet; a disciple of Kunio Yanagita, he establishes an academic field named , a mix of Japanese folklore, Japanese classics and Shintō religion (surname: Orikuchi)
 March 9 – Ion Buzdugan, born Ivan Alexandrovici Buzdâga (died 1967), Bessarabian-Romanian poet, folklorist and politician
 May 10 – J. C. Bloem (died 1966), Dutch
 May 13 – Nagata Mikihiko 長田幹彦 (died 1964), Shōwa period poet, playwright and screenwriter (surname: Nagata)
 May 15 – Edwin Muir (died 1959), Scottish poet, novelist and translator
 May 16 – Jakob van Hoddis (died 1942), German
 May 31 - Saint-John Perse (died 1975), French diplomat, poet and winner of the Nobel Prize for literature in 1960
 June 20 – Kurt Schwitters (died 1947), German
 June 22 – Sir Julian Sorell Huxley (died 1975), English evolutionary biologist, humanist and internationalist
 June 28 – Orrick Glenday Johns (died 1946), American poet
 August 3 – Rupert Brooke  (died on active service off Skyros, 1915), English poet
 August 19 – Francis Ledwidge (killed in action near Ypres in Belgium, 1917), Irish poet, "poet of the blackbirds"
 September 1 – Blaise Cendrars, pen name of Frédéric Louis Sauser (died 1961), Swiss novelist and poet naturalized as a French citizen in 1916
 September 7 – Edith Sitwell (died 1964), English poet and critic
 September 21 – Sir Thomas Herbert Parry-Williams (died 1975), Welsh poet, translator and academic
 September 16 – Hans Arp (died 1966), German
 September 27 – Frederick Macartney (died 1980), Australian
 October 11 – Pierre Jean Jouve (died 1976), French poet and novelist
 October 30 – Georg Heym (drowned 1912), German poet
 November 15 – Marianne Moore (died 1972), American Modernist poet and writer
 December 6 – Minakami Takitarō 水上滝太郎 pen name of Abe Shōzō (died 1940), Japanese, Shōwa period poet, novelist, literary critic and essayist (surname: Minakami)
 December 8 – Elizabeth Daryush (died 1977), English poet, daughter of Robert Bridges
 December 27 – Edward Andrade (died 1971), English physicist and poet.
 December 30 – K.M. Munshi (died 1971), Indian Gujarati-language novelist, playwright, writer, politician and lawyer
 Also:
 Skipwith Cannell (died 1957), American poet associated with the Imagist group (pronounce his last name with the stress on the second syllable)
 Margaret Curran (died 1962), Australian poet, editor and journalist
 Alphonse Métérié (died 1967), French newspaper editor, teacher and poet
 Ramnarayan V. Pathak (died 1955), Indian, Gujarati-language poet and husband of Heera Pathak
 Sukumar Ray (সুকুমার রায়) (died 1923), Indian, Gujarati-language humorous poet, short-story writer and playwright
 Jatindranath Sengupta (died 1954), Indian, Gujarati-language poet and writer

Deaths
Birth years link to the corresponding "[year] in poetry" article:
 February 27 – Edward Rowland Sill, American
 July 15 – Adrien Rouquette (born 1813), American poet and missionary
 October 12 – Dinah Maria Mulock Craik, born Dinah Maria Mulock, also referred to as Miss Mulock or Mrs. Craik (born 1826), English novelist and poet
 November 19 – Emma Lazarus (born 1849), American poet who wrote the sonnet "The New Colossus", associated with the Statue of Liberty, where it is engraved on a plaque
 date not known – Isabella Valancy Crawford (born 1850), Canadian, from heart failure

See also

 19th century in poetry
 19th century in literature
 List of years in poetry
 List of years in literature
 Victorian literature
 French literature of the 19th century
 Symbolist poetry
 Poetry

Notes

19th-century poetry
Poetry